The Wages of Sin (French: Le salaire du péché) is a 1956 French drama film directed by Denys de La Patellière and starring Danielle Darrieux, Jean-Claude Pascal and Jeanne Moreau. A film noir, it was adapted from the 1949 novel Emily Will Know by the American crime writer Nancy Rutledge It was shot at the Photosonor Studios in Paris. The film's sets were designed by the art director Paul-Louis Boutié.

Synopsis
In La Rochelle Jean, an ambitious journalist, marries Isabelle the daughter of a wealthy shipowner but finds her cut out any inheritance. Later when he has discovered that she has been secretly added back into her father's will, he dreams about killing him and scares the old man into a heart attack. The only witness to the crime is the shipowner's nurse Angele who he seduces and now becomes his lover and accomplice, plotting to kill Isabelle so that they can claim the inheritance.

Cast
 Danielle Darrieux as Isabelle Lindstrom
 Jean-Claude Pascal as 	Jean de Charvin
 Jeanne Moreau as 	Angèle Ribot
 Jean Debucourt as 	Frank Lindstrom
 Marcel Bozzuffi as un marin présidant aux obsèques
 Michel Etcheverry as Docteur Maroual
 Jean Lanier as 	Le pasteur
 Christian Lude as 	Benoît	
 Julien Verdier as Le libraire
 Georges Chamarat as 	Le médecin
 Pierre Morin as  M. Logan, le signataire

References

Bibliography
Walker-Morrison, Deborah. Classic French Noir: Gender and the Cinema of Fatal Desire. Bloomsbury Publishing, 2020.

External links 
 

1956 films
1956 drama films
French drama films
1950s French-language films
Films directed by Denys de La Patellière
Films based on American novels
Films with screenplays by Roland Laudenbach
1950s French films
French black-and-white films